Pieter Wilhelm Adrianus Cort van der Linden (14 May 1846 – 15 July 1935) was a Dutch politician who served as Prime Minister of the Netherlands from 29 August 1913 to 9 September 1918.

Biography
He was the last prime minister to lead a liberal cabinet and the last liberal to be Prime Minister until Mark Rutte in 2010 (92 years later). One of Cort van der Linden's major achievements was maintaining Dutch neutrality during World War I although personally, he was pro-German.

He also introduced universal suffrage in the Netherlands in what is now known as the Pacification of 1917. That made the Social Democratic Workers' Party and the General League of Roman Catholic Caucuses win the 1918 elections. The Catholic Charles Ruijs de Beerenbrouck took Cort van der Linden's place as Prime Minister.

References

Literature

External links
Paul Moeyes: Cort van der Linden, Pieter Wilhelm Adriaan, in: 1914-1918-online. International Encyclopedia of the First World War.

Decorations

1846 births
1935 deaths
Dutch academic administrators
Dutch financial writers
19th-century Dutch historians
Dutch magazine editors
Dutch people of World War I
Dutch political writers
Dutch scholars of constitutional law
Independent politicians in the Netherlands
Jurisprudence academics
Knights Grand Cross of the Order of Orange-Nassau
Legal historians
Leiden University alumni
Monetarists
Monetary economists
Members of the Council of State (Netherlands)
Ministers of Foreign Affairs of the Netherlands
Ministers of Justice of the Netherlands
Ministers of the Interior of the Netherlands
Ministers of State (Netherlands)
Politicians from The Hague
Prime Ministers of the Netherlands
Remonstrants
Recipients of the Order of the Netherlands Lion
Academic staff of the University of Groningen
Academic staff of the University of Amsterdam
19th-century Dutch civil servants
19th-century Dutch economists
19th-century Dutch educators
19th-century Dutch lawyers
19th-century Dutch male writers
19th-century Dutch politicians
20th-century Dutch civil servants
20th-century Dutch economists
20th-century Dutch educators
20th-century Dutch lawyers
20th-century Dutch male writers
20th-century Dutch politicians